Bolsa Chica State Ecological Reserve is a natural reserve and public land in Orange County, governed by the state of California, and immediately adjacent to the city of Huntington Beach, California.  The reserve is designated by the California Department of Fish and Wildlife (CDFW) to protect a coastal wetland and upland, with both migratory and resident threatened and endangered species of wildlife and wildflowers.

The western boundary of the ecological reserve abuts two other state agency lands of State Route 1 (Pacific Coast Highway) managed by Cal Trans and California State Parks (Bolsa Chica State Beach).

The term bolsa chica means "little bag" in Spanish, as the area was part of a historic Mexican land grant named Rancho La Bolsa Chica. The reserve is also called many other names, including Bolsa Chica Lowlands, Bolsa Chica Wetlands, and Bolsa Chica Wildlife Refuge.

History
The history of Bolsa Chica is a long and varied one. The earliest peoples were the native Indians of California. Archaeologists have found cog stones which date back 8,000 years and are the only surviving relic of the Indian lifestyle. Their exact purpose is unknown, but speculation has centered on religious or astronomical use. Cog stones can be seen at the Bowers Museum in Santa Ana.

Once Spain colonized California, Spanish officials created vast land grants called ranchos. One such grant, Rancho Los Nietos, was given to Manuel Nieto. After Nieto died, the grant was partitioned in 1834 into five Mexican ranchos including Rancho Las Bolsas. Rancho La Bolsa Chica was separated from Rancho Las Bolsas in 1841. The grant was later owned by Abel Stearns.

Prior to 1899, there had been a natural ocean entrance to the wetlands where the East Garden Grove Wintersburg Channel, then a small stream, is now located.  In 1899, the Bolsa Chica Gun Club was formed by a group of wealthy businessmen from Los Angeles and Pasadena.  The duck-hunting club catered to politicians and celebrities such as Babe Ruth and Lou Gehrig.   They built a two-story structure on a mesa overlooking the Pacific Ocean. The Gun Club is responsible for damming off of Bolsa Chica from direct tidal flow with the ocean.

In July 1920, the Standard Oil Company entered a lease agreement with the Gun Club Board of Directors that would allow for them to begin oil extraction in between and around the Bolsa Wetlands. This contract specified that the initial bonus of $100,000 and subsequent revenues would be split 50/50 between the Bolsa Chica Gun Club and the Bolsa Chica Land Trust. Upon receipt of this money, it was then to be invested into “good, interest-bearing securities” (Board of Directors Meeting Jun 11, 1920).

In January 1921, in order to protect their newly acquired capital, the Gun Club assembled an investigative committee to complete a legal report that assessed the land title’s specifics in respect to protection from outside parties encroaching upon their tide and marshlands for oil drilling. The organization also wished to inquire as to whether they should pursue a specific title that would clearly define their rights in regard to oil drilling.

In the 1940s, it was feared that Japan would attack California. So the U.S. military constructed two bunkers at Bolsa Chica to defend the coastline. Gun turrets were also mounted on the mesa, but were fired only for testing purposes. The larger of the two bunkers was demolished in 1995. The smaller support bunker still exists but is closed off from public access. All that is left of the turrets are their circular frame.

In the 1960s, most of Bolsa Chica was acquired by Signal Landmark, and plans for a massive housing development and marina were released. State officials objected, and so in 1970 the developer set aside  alongside Pacific Coast Highway to create the Bolsa Chica Ecological Reserve. This action satisfied state officials but not members of the League of Women Voters and the American Association of University Women, who decided to create a new group, Amigos de Bolsa Chica ("Friends of Bolsa Chica"), to save and preserve more of the wetlands. Amigos were founded in 1976, and the 20-year battle to save the wetlands began.

In 1990, the Amigos and the developer, now called Hearthside Homes, entered a joint agreement to create the Bolsa Chica Conservancy. The conservancy's mission is to educate the public about the importance of wetlands.

The size of Hearthside Homes’ development decreased over the years. In 1992, the Bolsa Chica Land Trust was formed by individuals who thought more of Bolsa Chica should be saved from development than just the wetlands. The upland habitat provided nesting, shelter, and food for egrets, herons, and raptors that also used the wetlands.

In 1997, the Amigos' long-awaited goal of preserving the wetlands was reached when the state of California purchased  of Hearthside Homes’ holdings. Restoration would come seven years later at a cost of $147 million which opened an inlet to the Pacific Ocean for the first time since being dammed in 1899 was completed in 2006.

In November 2000, the California Coastal Commission, which regulates development along the state's coastline, ruled that development had to be limited to the upper half ("upper bench") of the Bolsa Chica mesa because the lower half ("lower bench") was too valuable as habitat. Koll—now called Hearthside Homes—sued. The case was eventually dismissed. The developer contributed to the campaign of bond measure Proposition 50, which included specific language to purchase land at Bolsa Chica. Proposition 50 passed, and the state ended up purchasing  of the lower bench, closing escrow in December 2005. Hearthside was free to develop the upper bench, and their 379-unit project (whittled down from the 5,000+ plan of the 1960s) broke ground in 2006.

An additional  of uplands still remains in private ownership and is being considered for development. Ongoing hearings are being held with the California Coastal Commission.

In November 2018, the Bolsa Chica Land Trust raised $1,000,000 to secure the Ridge and Goodell properties, totaling , which will prevent the land from being sold to a real estate developer to build townhouses, instead  will be preserved, protected and restored.

Setting

The Bolsa Chica Ecological Reserve boundaries are Warner Avenue to the north, Seapoint Avenue to the south, Pacific Coast Highway (PCH) to the west, and residential development to the east.

There are two small parking lots: the north lot southeast of the intersection of Warner and PCH, and the south lot on PCH across from the entrance to Bolsa Chica State Beach. The north lot contains the Bolsa Chica Interpretive Center. It is the starting point for the Mesa Trail, which leads to the overlook and rest stop at Mesa Point. The south lot is the starting point for the  Loop Trail, which crosses a wooden bridge, passes two overlooks, and returns to the parking lot via a sand-dune trail paralleling PCH.

The East Garden Grove Wintersburg Channel runs through the Reserve. Beginning in December 2007, flood control improvements were made by the County of Orange to reinforce the levees damaged in the rains of 2005 and protect the wetlands.  In addition, the Newport–Inglewood Fault goes through the reserve.

Interpretive Center 

Open seven days a week from 9 a.m. to 4 p.m., the Bolsa Chica Conservancy Interpretive Center offers live animal exhibits, aquaria, maps and information about Bolsa Chica and education programs on wetland science. The main room’s exhibits include live marine life species native to Bolsa Chica and the southern California coast, including bat stars, ochre stars, giant-spined stars, warty sea cucumbers, Kellet’s whelks, chestnut cowries, striped shore crabs, and California spiny lobster. A second exhibit room includes live reptiles such as California kingsnakes, San Diego gopher snake, coastal rosy boa, two-striped garter snakes, and alligator lizards. Throughout the center there are many examples of taxidermy including opossums, snakes and birds such as the great blue heron, California brown pelican, Cooper’s hawk, red-shouldered hawk, and Anna’s hummingbird.

Community Involvement

Approximately 30,000 people visit the reserve each year.  Hiking, photography, and birdwatching are popular activities at the reserve.

There are special regulations in force for the Bolsa Chica Ecological Reserve:
 Fishing shall be permitted at designated areas around outer Bolsa Bay only.
 Pets are prohibited from entering the reserve except when they remain inside a motor vehicle.

Tours
Free public tours are offered each month by three organizations at Bolsa Chica:
 First Saturday at 9 a.m. is offered by the Amigos de Bolsa Chica from the south parking lot.
 Second Saturday from 10 a.m. to 12 noon is offered by the Bolsa Chica Conservancy from the north lot.
 Third Sunday at 10 a.m. is conducted by the Bolsa Chica Land Trust from the south parking lot.

Amigos de Bolsa Chica 
The Amigos offer a number of programs to advocate the preservation, restoration, and maintenance of Bolsa Chica, emphasizing longstanding advocacy, community awareness efforts, and ongoing restoration. Some of the Amigos’ most popular community-based programs include: 
 Education and Research: In addition to private and public docent-led walking tours, a docent training program, and multiple education-based book publications on the Bolsa Chica, the Amigos' FLOW Program ("Follow and Learn about the Ocean and Wetland") offers members of the community an opportunity to learn more about coastal ecology and get involved in environmental quality monitoring efforts. Community members meet every Friday to collect and analyze water samples in part of a regional monitoring network. Data is sent to the California Department of Public Health, which maintains the state of California's Phytoplankton Monitoring Program. 
 Sustainable Restoration and Stewardship: For over 40 years, the Amigos have worked to preserve and maintain the Bolsa Chica Ecological Reserve. Community members have the opportunity to train to become a docent or citizen scientist, participate in monthly clean-ups of the wetlands, teach water quality classes to visiting students, and sit on a committee led by the Board of Directors.

Bolsa Chica Conservancy 
Bolsa Chica Conservancy hosts numerous after school and volunteer programs to encourage ecological participation, awareness and environmental action. In addition to community-building leadership and education programs, The Bolsa Chica Conservancy focuses its non-profit efforts on research and restoration:
 Research: In addition to consistent water quality testing, the conservancy encourages research by way of volunteer birders, who fill out bird sighting surveys for local population data. In order to focus on this research specifically with the endangered California least tern and the threatened western snowy plover, The Eyes on Nest Sites (EONS) project was launched in 2010.
 Restoration:Trash cleanup and environment restoration are important components in Bolsa Chica’s volunteering opportunities. In fact, Public Service Day is hosted on the last Saturday and second Sunday of every month; it typically includes trash removal, the planting of native plants, and invasive plant removal, all of which contribute to the health of these increasingly rare coastal wetland habitats.

Bolsa Chica Land Trust 
The Bolsa Chica Land Trust offers education and volunteer programs which encourage hands-on involvement with the Bolsa Chica Ecological Reserve. Highlights of their community programming include: 
 Stewards Restoration Project: The Stewards and Junior Stewards Programs, in collaboration with the California Department of Fish and Wildlife, are dedicated to the complete restoration of the Bolsa Chica Ecological Reserve's natural habitat. They meet bimonthly to reintroduce native species, remove of non-native species, and pick-up trash. 
 Miracles of the Marsh: The Land Trust's Miracles of the Marsh is an elementary school education program which offers students a walking docent-led tour of the Bolsa Chica. The program includes a field guide for teachers and a presentation prior to visiting.

Wildlife

Among the wildlife in the reserve are the shovelnose guitarfish, grey smooth-hound sharks, California halibut, and white seabass. There are also snakes in the grassy areas of the wetlands, ranging from harmless kingsnakes and gopher snakes in various colors to rattlesnakes, including western diamondbacks and Pacific rattlesnakes. Other wildlife include western fence lizard, cottontail rabbit, Beechey ground squirrel, and coyotes.

In spring and fall, the reserve is home to many migratory birds. As many as 321 out of Orange County's 420 bird species have been sighted at the reserve in the past decade. Bird species at the reserve include the endangered light-footed rail, snowy plover, Savannah sparrow, least tern, Caspian tern, great blue heron, snowy egret, double-crested cormorant, red-tailed hawk, great horned owl, and California gnatcatcher.

See also
 Bolsa Chica Basin State Marine Conservation Area
 Bolsa Chica State Beach

References

Further reading

External links

 Amigos de Bolsa Chica
 Bolsa Chica Conservancy
 Bolsa Chica Land Trust
 Bolsa Chica Lowlands Restoration Project

Wetlands of California
Nature reserves in California
Protected areas of Orange County, California
Geography of Huntington Beach, California
Estuaries of California
California State Reserves
California Department of Fish and Wildlife areas
Natural history of Orange County, California
Landforms of Orange County, California